Trans-Siberian Orchestra discography consists of seven studio albums, one soundtrack album, one compilation album, one EP, one video album and six singles.

Albums

Studio albums

Soundtrack albums

Compilation albums

Video albums

Extended plays

Singles

References

External links
Trans-Siberian Orchestra official website

Discographies of American artists
Rock music group discographies